Queen of the South may refer to:

People
 Queen of the South (biblical reference), an alternative title for the Queen of Sheba used in the New Testament
 "Queen of the South", a nickname for Kyrgyzstani stateswoman Kurmanjan Datka

Arts, entertainment, and media
 Queen of the South, the English title of La Reina del Sur, a 2002 Spanish novel by Arturo Pérez-Reverte
 La Reina del Sur (telenovela), a 2011 Spanish-language telenovela produced by the United States-based television network Telemundo based on the novel
 Queen of the South (TV series), an American television series adaptation of the telenovela
 "Queen of the South", a song by the Scottish record producer Bill Drummond on the 1986 album The Man
 "Queen of the South", a song on the 1993 album Liberation by The Divine Comedy

Sports
 Queen of the South F.C., a Scottish professional football club in Dumfries
 Queen of the South Stakes, a South Australian Jockey Club horse race